The UC San Diego Tritons women's basketball team represents University of California, San Diego, located in San Diego, California. Through the 2019–20 season, the team competed in NCAA Division II as a member of the California Collegiate Athletic Association. The Tritons will begin a four-year transition to NCAA Division I in July 2020, joining the Big West Conference.

The Tritons will make their Division I debut under ninth-year head coach Heidi VanDerveer.

The team plays its games at RIMAC Arena on its campus in San Diego.

Postseason

NCAA Division II tournament results
The Tritons made twelve appearances in the NCAA Division II women's basketball tournament. They had a combined record of 12–12.

References